Ligunga is a town in southern Tanzania near the border with Mozambique.

Transport 

In October 2007, it was proposed to railway to Ligunga to Mlimba and from Ligunga via Mchuchuma to Mbamba Bay on Lake Malawi.

Access 

Liganga lies in a gap in the mountains that provides better than average access to Lake Malawi.  This gap follows the course of the Ruvuma River, which forms the border between Tanzania and Mozambique.

See also 

 Transport in Tanzania

References 

Populated places in Ruvuma Region